Edward Larocque Tinker (New York City, September 12, 1881 – July 6, 1968, New York City) was an American writer and philanthropist who developed a deep interest in the culture of Latin America and spent much of his life exploring it. Tinker was the grandson of Joseph Larocque. He studied at Columbia University Law School. He achieved Ph.D.'s in literature from the University of Paris and the University of Madrid. He also wrote extensively on the culture and history of the city of New Orleans.

His mother was Louise (Larocque) Tinker, his father was Henry Champlin Tinker, and he married Frances McKee on January 16, 1916. His sister was Annie Rensselaer Tinker, a suffragist and philanthropist.

Tinker created the Tinker Foundation in 1959 in memory of his second wife Frances McKee Tinker, his father Henry Champlin Tinker, and his grandfather Edward Greenfield Tinker.

The Edward Larocque Tinker Library is located at the Harry Ransom Center, the University of Texas at Austin.

Works
Lafcadio Hearn's American Days, 1924
Closed Shutters: Old New Orleans - the Eighties, 1931
Les écrits de langue française en Louisiane au XIXe siècle, 1932
The horsemen of the Americas and the literature they inspired, 1953
Gombo Comes to Philadelphia1957
Life and Literature of the Pampas, 1961
Centaurs of Many Lands, 1964

External links
 www.tinker.org

References

1881 births
1968 deaths
20th-century American philanthropists
20th-century American male writers
University of Paris alumni
Columbia Law School alumni
American expatriates in France
American expatriates in Spain